Pegasomyia is a genus of flies in the family Tabanidae.

Species
Pegasomyia abaurea (Philip, 1941)
Pegasomyia ruficornis (Bigot, 1892)

References

Tabanidae
Brachycera genera
Diptera of North America